Livenka is the name of several rural localities in Russia:
Livenka, Belgorod Oblast, a selo in Krasnogvardeysky District of Belgorod Oblast
Livenka, Kostroma Oblast, a village in Klevantsovskoye Settlement of Ostrovsky District of Kostroma Oblast
Livenka, Pavlovsky District, Voronezh Oblast, a selo in Livenskoye Rural Settlement of Pavlovsky District of Voronezh Oblast
Livenka, Semiluksky District, Voronezh Oblast, a village in Zemlyanskoye Rural Settlement of Semiluksky District of Voronezh Oblast

See also
Dalnaya Livenka, a selo in Gubkinsky District of Belgorod Oblast